Zahra Shahid Hussain also known as Zara Apa, was a Pakistani activist-politician, teacher and the senior vice president of Imran Khan's Pakistan Tehreek-e-Insaf (PTI) in Sindh. She had formerly served as the president for PTI's women's wing of the party in Sindh, and was a member of the central executive committee of the party. On 18 May 2013, she was assassinated outside her house in the upscale Defence Housing Authority neighborhood in Karachi.

Assassination
According to police, Hussain was ambushed by two people on a motorcycle. Her murder took place on the eve of a highly contested partial rerun of the general election. According to a witness, "The assailants opened fire...as soon as she reached the gate of her residence. Apparently they were there to target her only". An eyewitness said that she had handed the attackers her belongings, but they shot her even then. Another report from Dawn News said that "[a]ccording to police, three motorcycle riders tried to steal Hussain’s handbag and opened fire upon resistance" (emphasis added). This report attributed the "handed [the purse] over" report to PTI leader Firdous Shamim.

PTI leader Imran Khan blamed Altaf Hussain a wanted criminal in Pakistan who is in self-imposed exile since 1992 after a crackdown was launched against his party, former leader of Karachi's dominant Muttahida Qaumi Movement (MQM) party for her murder. The MQM chief a few days earlier had used threatening language saying his party workers would teach protesters at Teen Talwar a lesson if he ordered them to do so. Altaf Hussain also threatened to harm those who were hatching conspiracies against MQM and said “I am about to set free my enraged followers if opposition against our party is not stopped”.

See also

Imran Khan

References

Year of birth missing
2013 deaths
Muhajir people
Pakistan Tehreek-e-Insaf politicians
Politicians from Karachi
Assassinated Pakistani politicians
Targeted killings in Pakistan
People murdered in Karachi
Deaths by firearm in Sindh